Alexander Parkhomenko may refer to:

 Alexander Parkhomenko, Russian DJ with duo Matisse & Sadko
 Aliaksandr Parkhomenka (born 1981), Belarusian decathlete
 Alexander Parkhomenko (film), a 1942 Soviet adventure film